Anna Leigh Waters (born January 26, 2007) is an American professional pickleball player. As of October 2022, she is ranked No. 1 in the world for doubles, No. 1 for mixed doubles, and No. 1 for singles by the Professional Pickleball Association. She was the youngest professional pickleball player in history at age 12, and is known for playing doubles in a team with her mother, Leigh Waters.

Pickleball career 
Waters was raised in Delray Beach, Florida. In 2017, during Hurricane Irma, her family temporarily visited her grandparents in Allentown, Pennsylvania, where she and her mother began to play pickleball. Waters quickly became a strong player and played her first tournament in Dallas, Texas when Waters was 11 years old. In 2019, at age 12, Waters became the youngest professional pickleball player in history.

Since taking 2020 off from playing because of the COVID-19 pandemic, Waters has won tournaments in doubles, mixed doubles, and singles. Waters' doubles partner is her mother, Leigh Waters, a former NCAA Division I tennis player at the University of South Carolina. They are the only mother-daughter team in professional pickleball. Waters has played mixed doubles with Ben Johns as her partner. She has also played pickleball games with swimmer Michael Phelps, actor Jamie Foxx, boxer Sugar Ray Leonard, and golfers Scottie Scheffler and Jordan Spieth.

Waters won the 2021 doubles national championship at the Orlando Cup. In 2021, she also won gold in singles at the Newport Beach Showcase, Orlando Cup, and Texas Open, as well as the Margaritaville USA Pickleball Nationals Championship. Waters won the bronze medal in singles at the 2021 U.S. Open, and silver in doubles and bronze in mixed doubles at the 2021 Acrytech Atlanta Open. Waters plays with an aggressive style, characterized by strength and speed, as opposed to the delicate placement of conventional pickleball playing.

In 2022, Waters and her mother were in the first nationally televised pickleball match in history on CBS Sports, in which they defeated Lucy Kovalova and Callie Smith at the Skechers Invitational Summer Championship at the Riviera Country Club in Los Angeles.

Life 
In addition to pickleball, Waters was a competitive soccer player, but has stopped playing soccer to focus on pickleball. Waters' mother, Leigh, is her coach and manager in addition to her doubles partner. Waters is homeschooled by her grandmother, and Leigh has stated that Waters will likely delay college to pursue her professional pickleball career.

Waters is sponsored by sportswear manufacturer Fila.

References 

2007 births
American sportswomen
Living people
Pickleball players
Sportspeople from Florida